Somali National Bandy Association is the governing body for the sports of bandy and rink bandy for Somalia. The organization was founded in 2013 and is formally a part of the Somali Olympic Committee. The same year, the Somalia national bandy team became the first squad from Africa to join the Federation of International Bandy. The team consists of Somalian nationals, mostly living in Sweden. It played in the 2014 Bandy World Championship.

References

Federation of International Bandy members
Bandy governing bodies
Bandy
Bandy in Somalia
2013 establishments in Somalia